Taibai County is a county in the west of Shaanxi province, China. It is under the administration of the prefecture-level city of Baoji.

Taibai County is located west of the Qin Mountains and southeast of downtown Baoji. It is named after nearby Mount Taibai, a major peak of the Qin Mountains. It has a population of 52,000. The county was first established on December 27, 1952, being part of neighboring counties before then.

The county is noted for its high air quality, 92% of the county is covered by forests.

Administrative divisions
As 2020, Taibai County is divided to 7 towns. In 2001, Baiyun township was merged into Zuitou and Erlangba township was merged into Huangbaiyuan. In 2011, Guanglong township was merged into Yingge, and Huangbaiyuan and Wangjialeng were changed from township to town.
Towns

Climate

References

County-level divisions of Shaanxi
Baoji